Asteromyrtus lysicephala, also known as Kennedy's heath or Lockhart River tea-tree, is a species of plant in the myrtle family Myrtaceae that is native to the Aru Islands, southern New Guinea and northern Australia.

Description
The species grows mainly as a shrub to 3 m in height by 1.5 m across, occasionally as a small tree up to 13 m high. The leaves are small and the white to pale pink flowers the smallest of the genus.

Distribution and habitat
In Australia, the species’ natural range is restricted to the Cape York Peninsula of northern Queensland and the Top End of the Northern Territory. In New Guinea it occurs in the Western Province of Papua New Guinea and in Papua, as well as in the Aru Islands of Indonesia. It grows in heathlands, open woodlands and seasonally flooded monsoon forests on sandy to clay soils.

References

lysicephala
Myrtales of Australia
Flora of New Guinea
Flora of the Maluku Islands
Flora of the Northern Territory
Flora of Queensland
Plants described in 1886